Ištvan Dudaš (born 2 August 1973) is a former Serbian professional footballer, who works as goalkeeper coach for Olympic Charleroi.

Personal life
Born in Bačka Topola, SR Serbia, Dudaš is of Hungarian origin and holds a Belgian passport.

References

Living people
1973 births
People from Bačka Topola
Hungarians in Vojvodina
Association football goalkeepers
Serbian footballers
Serbian people of Hungarian descent
Serbian expatriate footballers
FK TSC Bačka Topola players
FK Vojvodina players
FK Hajduk Kula players
UE Lleida players
Expatriate footballers in Spain
R. Charleroi S.C. players
R.W.D.M. Brussels F.C. players
Belgian Pro League players
Expatriate footballers in Belgium